This is a list of films produced in Pakistan in 2001 (see 2001 in film) and in the Urdu language.

2001

See also
2001 in Pakistan

External links
 Search Pakistani film - IMDB.com

2001
Pakistani
Films